The Defense Simulation Internet (DSI) was a specialized, wide-area network created to support Distributed Interactive Simulation and videoconferences. It was sponsored by DARPA, and built and operated by BBN Technologies from about 1991-1995, after which time it was operated by the Defense Information Systems Agency (DISA).

The DSI evolved from DARPA's earlier Terrestrial Wideband Network, which could provide the realtime multicast with bandwidth guarantees that are essential to distributed interactive simulations via the Internet Stream Protocol (ST-II). A Defense Science Board study in 1993 highlighted the importance of these capabilities in simulations, and by late 1994, the DSI connected about 100 local area networks at sites around the world. Many links operated at multiple T1 circuits, for an aggregate bandwidth of about 6 megabits/second. In 1994, DSI program management transitioned to a joint program office of DARPA and DISA, and after the network became fully operational in February 1995, DARPA handed off all management responsibility to DISA.

Phase I of the DSI was implemented by BBN T/20 routers running the Internet Stream Protocol. Phase II, completed in October 1997, was a reimplementation using Cisco 7500 routers running the Resource Reservation Protocol (RSVP) over ATM permanent virtual circuits. The Phase II topology was a mesh of 7 backbone nodes, with 46 tail circuits running to the other DSI sites as of April 1998. (See D. Sahu for a Phase II network map and extensive details.)

References 
 "Impact of Advanced Distributed Simulation on Readiness, Training and Prototyping", Report of the Defense Science Board Task Force on Simulation, Readiness and Prototyping, 1993.
 "High-quality multimedia conferencing through a long-haul packet network", Chip Elliott, Proceedings of the first ACM international conference on Multimedia, August 2-6, 1993, pages 91-98.
 "Emerging technologies - national/Defense Information Infrastructure and the Defense Information Systems Network", J.M. Pullen, D. Cohen, and D. Wood, Proceedings of MILCOM '93, October 11-14, 1993.
 "Networking for Distributed Virtual Simulation", Mark Pullen, Computer Networks and ISDN Systems Journal, vol. 27, no. 3, Elsevier North-Holland, pages 387-394, December 1994. 
 "Networking Technology and DIS", Mark Pullen and D. Wood, Proceedings of the IEEE, vol. 83, no. 8, pages 1156-1167, August 1995.
 Distributed Interactive Simulation of Combat, Office of Technology Assessment, DIANE Publishing Company, 1996, page 27.
 "Modeling Distributed Techniques for Synthetic Training Environments", D. B. Cavitt, C. M. Overstreet, K. J. Maly, in Advanced Computer System Design, edited by George Zobrist, Kallol Bagchi, Kishor Trivedi, CRC Press, 1999, page 243.
 "A Study of the Defense Simulation Internet (DSI) for the Joint Advanced Distributed Simulation (JADS) Project", Devaraj Sahu, Mitre Corporation, April 1998.

DARPA
Wide area networks
History of telecommunications in the United States